Catriona casha is a species of sea slug, an aeolid nudibranch, a marine gastropod mollusk in the family Trinchesiidae.

Distribution
This species was described from Cape Town docks, on the Atlantic Ocean coast of South Africa.

References

Endemic fauna of South Africa
Trinchesiidae
Gastropods described in 1981